The 2017 Big East men's soccer tournament, was the fifth men's soccer tournament of the new Big East Conference, formed in July 2013 after the original Big East Conference split into two leagues along football lines. Including the history of the original conference, it was the 22nd edition of the Big East tournament.

Seeding 
The top six teams qualified. Tiebreakers were determined by the team's winning percentage, followed by head-to-head record.

Bracket

References 

Big East Conference Men's Soccer Tournament
Big East East Men's Soccer
Big East East Men's Soccer
Big East East Men's Soccer
Big East East Men's Soccer